The De Gasperi IV Cabinet held office in the Italian Republic from from 31 May 1947 to 23 May 1948, a total of 358 days, or 11 months and 22 days.

Party breakdown

Beginning of term
 Christian Democracy (DC): prime minister, 11 ministers, 7 undersecretaries
 Italian Liberal Party (PLI): 2 ministers (incl. 1 deputy prime minister)
 Independents: 3 ministers

End of term
 Christian Democracy (DC): prime minister, 9 ministers, 10 undersecretaries
 Socialist Party of Italian Workers (PSLI): 1 deputy prime minister, 2 ministers, 3 undersecretaries
 Italian Liberal Party (PLI): 2 ministers (incl. 1 deputy prime minister), 3 undersecretaries
 Italian Republican Party (PRI): 1 deputy prime minister, 1 minister, 2 undersecretaries
 Independent: 3 ministers

Composition

References 

Italian governments
1947 establishments in Italy
1948 disestablishments in Italy
Cabinets established in 1947
Cabinets disestablished in 1947
De Gasperi 4 Cabinet